John Martin Baylor is a former professional American football player who played cornerback for five seasons for the Indianapolis Colts.

References

1965 births
Living people
Sportspeople from Meridian, Mississippi
Players of American football from Mississippi
American football cornerbacks
American football safeties
Southern Miss Golden Eagles football players
Indianapolis Colts players